Bombacoideae is a subfamily of the mallow family, Malvaceae. It contains herbaceous and woody plants. Their leaves are alternate, commonly palmately lobed, with small and caducous stipules. The flowers are hermaphroditic and actinomorphic; the calyx has 5 sepals united at the base, which are not accompanied by an epicalyx (involucel). The corolla has 5 free petals and an androecium of numerous stamens, typically with free filaments which are not fused in a staminal tube (column). The pollen is smooth and the ovary superior and pluricarpellate. The fruits are schizocarpous or capsular.

Genera

Classification
Some taxa in this subfamily were previously grouped under the now-obsolete family Bombacaceae, as recent phylogenetic research has shown that Bombacaceae as traditionally circumscribed (including tribe Durioneae) is not a monophyletic group. Camptostemon, Lagunaria, Pentaplaris and Uladendron might more appropriately be placed in Malvoideae, as might the tribe Matisieae (Matisia, Phragmotheca and Quararibea).

References

External links
 
 

 
Rosid subfamilies